Kneippen is an area in Norrköping, Sweden. It is named after an old bath that was inspired by the teachings of Sebastian Kneipp.  

Kneippen is a very exclusive area with the highest house prices in the city.

Norrköping